Oasis Academy Immingham (formerly The Immingham School) is a coeducational secondary school with academy status located in Immingham, North East Lincolnshire, England.

History
Previously a community school administered by North East Lincolnshire Council, The Immingham School converted to academy status on 1 September 2007 and was renamed Oasis Academy Immingham. As an academy the school is sponsored by the Oasis Trust, however Oasis Academy Immingham continues to coordinate with North East Lincolnshire Council for admissions.

Description
Oasis Academy Immingham is part of the Oasis Community Learning group, and evangelical Christian charity  The trust have guided forty schools out of special measures. 19 per cent of the 52 Oasis academies classified as failing. The trust's founder Reverend Steve Chalke says "Turning round a school is sometimes a quick fix, it really, truly is. And sometimes it’s a really long, hard, hard job".

Oasis has a long term strategy for enhancing the performance of its schools. Firstly it has devised a standard curriculum, that each school can safely adopt knowing it will deliver the National Curriculum. Secondly it has invested in staff training so they are focused on improving the outcomes for the students, and thirdly, through its Horizons scheme it is providing each member of staff and student with a tablet.

Curriculum
Virtually all maintained schools and academies follow the National Curriculum, and their success is judged on how well they succeed in delivering a 'broad and balanced curriculum'. Schools endeavour to get all students to achieve the English Baccalaureate qualification- this must include core subjects a modern or ancient foreign language, and either History or Geography.

The academy operates a three-year, Key Stage 3 where all the core National Curriculum subjects are taught. This is a transition period from primary to secondary education, that builds on the skills, knowledge and understanding gained at primary school, and introduces youngsters who are starting from a lower than average base to wider, robust and challenging programmes of study needed to gain qualifications at Key Stage 4.

At Key Stage 4 the focus is on the English Baccalaureate, and there are daily maths, English and science lessons- plus some options. French is the taught modern language.

Oasis Academy Immingham offers GCSEs and BTECs as programmes of study for pupils,. The school also specialises in engineering, commerce and enterprise.

Notable former pupils
 Richard Barnbrook, BNP London Assembly leader from 2008–12

References

Secondary schools in the Borough of North East Lincolnshire
Academies in the Borough of North East Lincolnshire
Immingham
Immingham